Xu Rong (born around 1958), is a former badminton player from China, who ranks among the best of her time.

Career
Xu Rong was one of the main Chinese players who dominated the women's game after China joined the International Badminton Federation in 1981 in both singles and doubles. She was well known for her all-rounded excellence on the court, and she won the National Championships in singles (1977). Although primarily a doubles player she was strong enough in singles to reach the final of the Denmark Open, and to win the very first Hong Kong Open in 1982. With her regular partner Wu Jianqui she won the Swedish Open in 1982 and the prestigious All-England Championships in 1983. Xu Rong was also a member of the woman's team that won the Asian Games Team Event in 1982. Xu Rong and Wu were bronze medalists at the 1983 IBF World Championships. In one of her last international appearances Xu won women's doubles at the 1985 Hong Kong Open with Han Aiping. She was a member of China's world champion Uber Cup (women's international) team in 1984, and helped her team to a 5-0 victory. She retired in 1985.

Achievements

World Championships

World Cup

IBF World Grand Prix 
The World Badminton Grand Prix sanctioned by International Badminton Federation (IBF) from 1983 to 2006.

International tournaments

Notes

Chinese female badminton players
Living people
1958 births
Badminton players from Jiangsu
Asian Games medalists in badminton
Badminton players at the 1982 Asian Games
Asian Games gold medalists for China
Medalists at the 1982 Asian Games